Wetware is a 2018 American science fiction film written and directed by Jay Craven and starring Jerry O'Connell. It is based on Craig Nova's novel of the same name.

Cast
Jerry O'Connell
Rusty DeWees
Gordon Clapp
Morgan Wolk
Cameron Scoggins
Nicole Shalhoub
Aurélia Thiérrée
Garret Lee Hicks
Matt Salinger
Allan Nicholls
Dan Levintritt
Ariel Zevon
Tara O'Reilly
Nettie Lane

Production
The film was shot in Brattleboro, Vermont and Nantucket.

Release
The film premiered at the Town Hall Theater in Middlebury, Vermont on September 29, 2018. It was also released at Catamount Arts in St. Johnsbury, Vermont on October 5, 2018.

References

External links
 

American science fiction films
Films based on American novels
2018 science fiction films
Films shot in Massachusetts
Films shot in Vermont
2010s English-language films
2010s American films